Litthabitella elliptica is a species of very small freshwater snails with a gill and an operculum, aquatic gastropod mollusks in the family Hydrobiidae.

This species is endemic to France.

References 

Litthabitella
Endemic molluscs of Metropolitan France
Gastropods described in 1874
Taxonomy articles created by Polbot
Taxobox binomials not recognized by IUCN